Olena Khlusovych (born 2 December 1969) is a retired Ukrainian triple jumper.

She finished twelfth at the 1996 Olympic Games. She also competed at the World Indoor Championships in 1995 and 1997, the 1997 World Championships and the 2000 Olympic Games without reaching the final.

Her personal best jump is 14.38 metres, achieved during the 1996 Olympic qualification round.

References

1969 births
Living people
Ukrainian female triple jumpers
Athletes (track and field) at the 1996 Summer Olympics
Athletes (track and field) at the 2000 Summer Olympics
Olympic athletes of Ukraine